Global Business Brigades (GBB) is part of Global Brigades, Inc. (GB) which is a secular, 501c3 nonprofit organization that empowers university students and young professionals in North America and Europe to provide communities in developing countries with sustainable solutions in health care, architecture, legal, environmental and micro-enterprise development.

Global Business Brigades  focuses on community based micro-enterprise development. Volunteers collaborate with community members to resolve fundamental challenges surrounding micro-enterprises in the developing world by implementing practical business solutions that improve the greater community. Students attend a one-week “brigade” in which they experience hands-on collaboration with local NGOs and community leaders. They provide business workshops and strategic investment consulting and make a "community investment" at the end of the week to give the community the financial means to implement the desired changes. By inspiring micro-entrepreneurs GBB focuses on empowering students and communities alike to be a catalyst for change.

Since 2004, more than 10,000 volunteers have served over 300,000 beneficiaries.

The Global Business Brigades Model

The in country team of GBB first identifies a community of maximum priority considering a set of factors including education, access to running water, health, socio-economic situation, environmental awareness, legal structures and whether or not other organizations have already a presence in the community. Then, the selected community becomes the focus of the business brigades coming to the country. In this way, GBB seeks the sustainability of the support being offered by creating long-term relationships and offering repeated brigades to the same community in search of economic development for the entire community.

In brief, the GBB model is as follows:

Selection of Target Beneficiaries:
 Under-resourced rural communities with limited access to formal financial institutions.
 Small agricultural producers with low profits.
 Small businesses
 Entrepreneurs among the community

Action Plan:
 Creating and supporting community based micro credit co-ops to introduce the community to basic business techniques and forms of support.
 Provide a seed capital to the co-op for it to start growing and serving as a way for small entrepreneurs to start or expand their businesses.

The Importance of the Model:
 The community is introduced to business language and accounting.
 The micro-credit co-op serves as a catalyst for community bases business initiatives.
 The seed capital transforms into a growing community fund that stays within the community.
 With the micro-credit co-op, the community rises out of poverty through collective development.

Notes

External links
 Global Brigades student resource site

International medical and health organizations